Chemic  may refer to:

 Chemic, an element of the arcade game Phozon
 Nickname for Midland High School (Midland, Michigan)
 Chemic (scientist), a scientist trained in the science of chemistry
 Widnes RLFC/Widnes Vikings (The Chemics), an English professional rugby league club